The 1904 North Dakota gubernatorial election was held on November 8, 1904. Republican nominee Elmore Y. Sarles defeated Democratic nominee Marthinus F. Hegge with 70.71% of the vote.

General election

Candidates
Major party candidates
Elmore Y. Sarles, Republican
Marthinus F. Hegge, Democratic

Other candidates
Arthur Basset, Socialist
Hans H. Aaker, Prohibition

Results

References

1904
North Dakota
Gubernatorial